Takashi Yamada (born 2 October 1938) is a Japanese sailor. He competed in the Finn event at the 1964 Summer Olympics.

References

External links
 
 Image of Yamada during the Olympics via kiji.is

1938 births
Living people
Japanese male sailors (sport)
Olympic sailors of Japan
Sailors at the 1964 Summer Olympics – Finn
Place of birth missing (living people)